James Charles Morgan (October 31, 1939 – August 4, 2019) was a Canadian politician. He represented the electoral district of Bonavista South in the Newfoundland and Labrador House of Assembly from 1972 to 1989. He was a member of the Progressive Conservative Party of Newfoundland and Labrador.

Early life 
The son of Samuel Robert and Helen Morgan, he was born at St. John's and was educated at Memorial University, at Devry Technical School in Toronto and at Sir George Williams University in Montreal. In 1967, Morgan married Denise Philippe.

Political career 
Morgan was elected to the Newfoundland assembly in 1972. He served in the provincial cabinet as Minister of Transportation and Communications, as Minister of Tourism, as Minister of Forestry and Agriculture and as Minister of Fisheries. He was a candidate for the Progressive Conservative party leadership in 1979 but withdrew, transferring his support to Brian Peckford. In 1988, he made an unsuccessful bid to be the federal Progressive Conservative candidate in the riding of St. John's East but Ross Reid was chosen instead.

Death 
Morgan died in St. John's on August 4, 2019, at the age of 79.

References

1939 births
2019 deaths
Politicians from St. John's, Newfoundland and Labrador
Progressive Conservative Party of Newfoundland and Labrador MHAs
Memorial University of Newfoundland alumni
Sir George Williams University alumni